Clonygowan (also Cloneygowan)   is a village in County Offaly, Ireland, on the R420 regional road between Tullamore to Portarlington road. As of the 2016 census, it had a population of 198 people. The main village centre is built around a central green.

Places of interest
While Clonygowan House no longer exists, a dovecote, designed in the manner of a folly and built on the estate grounds circa 1830, survives as a reminder of the former house.

Events and culture
The annual Gooseberry Fair takes place in Clonygowan every August.

Education
Scoil Mhuire is a five-classroom primary school located in Clonygowan.

References

Towns and villages in County Offaly